T3, also known as Chingjia International Center, is a skyscraper office building located in Taichung's 7th Redevelopment Zone, Xitun District, Taichung, Taiwan. The building was completed in 2013. As of February 2021, it is the 49th tallest building in Taichung. 

The building is environmentally friendly and energy-saving and has a deep window glass façade. In addition to the 10-meter high three-entry style corridor entrance hall and modern offices, facilities of the office building includes a sky garden banquet hall on the top floor similar to the one at Lebua at State Tower in Bangkok, a fitness room on the 14th floor, and more than 10 conference rooms of various sizes.

See also 
 List of tallest buildings in Taiwan
 List of tallest buildings in Taichung
 T-Power (skyscraper)

References

2013 establishments in Taiwan
Skyscraper office buildings in Taichung
Office buildings completed in 2013
Taichung's 7th Redevelopment Zone